Coelogyne virescens is a species of orchid.

virescens